Crataegus fluviatilis is a species of hawthorn similar to C. flabellata and to C. macrosperma. The name C. apiomorpha has been applied to a form of the species that is most similar to C. macrosperma.

References

fluviatilis
Flora of North America